The nations which make up Central Asia are five of the former Soviet republics: Kazakhstan, Kyrgyzstan, Turkmenistan, Tajikistan and Uzbekistan, which have a total population of about  million. Afghanistan is not always considered part of the region, but when it is, Central Asia has a total population of about 122 million (2016); Mongolia and Xinjiang (part of China) is also sometimes considered part of Central Asia due to its Central Asian cultural ties and traditions, although geographically it is East Asian. Most central Asians belong to religions which were introduced to the area within the last 1,500 years, such as Sunni Islam, Shia Islam, Ismaili Islam, Tengriism and Syriac Christianity (mostly East Syriac). Buddhism, however, was introduced to Central Asia over 2,200 years ago, and Zoroastrianism, over 2,500 years ago.

Ethnic groups

The below are demographic data on the ethnic groups in Central Asia

Genetic history

Ancient Pre-Neolithic Central Asia, as well as large parts of Siberia, were initially populated by a distinct Paleolithic population known as "Ancient North Eurasians", most closely related to "European hunter-gatherers", and linked to the early Tarim mummies. This early Central Asians and Siberians contributed significantly to the formation of Indigenous peoples of the Americas, next to significant geneflow from an Ancient East Asian component. The ancestry of modern Central Asian populations is however significantly derived from the Indo-Iranian and Turkic expansions from Europe and Northeast Asia respectively. Genetic data shows that the average of Central Asian Turkic-speaking peoples have around 50% ancestry derived from "Baikal hunter-gatherers", in contrast to Iranian-speaking Central Asians, specifically Yaghnobis and Tajiks, which display genetic continuity to Indo-Iranians of the Iron Age. Certain Turkic ethnic groups, specifically the Kazakhs and Kyrgyz display primarily East Asian ancestry. This is explained by substantial Mongolian contributions to the and Kyrgyz genome, through significant admixture between medieval Turkic Kipchaks with medieval Mongolians. The data suggests that the Mongol invasion of Central Asia had lasting impacts onto the genetic makeup of southeastern Kazakhs. Ancestry related to the earliest inhabitants, the Ancient North Eurasians, is still found in varying degrees among modern day Central Asians.

Bronze Age Central Asia was populated by West-Eurasian Iranian-speaking peoples, as well as a minority of Paleosiberian peoples. Since the Iron Age, significant migrations from Eastern Asia and South Central Siberia took place, mostly associated with the expansion of Mongolic and Turkic peoples from a region corresponding to modern day Mongolia, transforming Central Asia from a region with largely West-Eurasian ancestry into the mostly Turkic-speaking groups of the present day, who are primarily of East Asian ancestry. Archaeogenetic studies on the remains from Iron Age Pazyryk culture burials suggest that after the end of the Indo-Iranian (Scythian) expansion, beginning in c. the 7th century BC, there was a gradual admixture event with Turkic peoples.

Populations of farmers and nomadic pastoralists coexisted in Central Asia since the Chalcolithic (4th millennium BC).
The two groups differ markedly in descent structure, as pastoralists are organized in exogamous patrilineal clan structures, while farmers are organized in extended families practicing endogamy (cousin marriage).
As a consequence, pastoralists have a significantly reduced diversity in patrilineal descent (Y-chromosome) compared to farmers.

Religion

See also
 Indo-Aryan migration hypothesis
 Turkic migration
 History of the Jews in Central Asia

Bibliography 

 Guarino-Vignon, P., Marchi, N., Bendezu-Sarmiento, J. et al. Genetic continuity of Indo-Iranian speakers since the Iron Age in southern Central Asia. Sci Rep 12, 733 (2022). https://doi.org/10.1038/s41598-021-04144-4

References

https://www.researchgate.net/profile/Chuan-Chao_Wang
https://synaptic.bio/publications/8629

 
 
Central Asian culture
History of Central Asia